Elections to Tower Hamlets London Borough Council were held on 2 May 1974. The whole council was up for election. Turnout was 18.3%.

Election result

|}

Results

References

1974
1974 London Borough council elections
20th century in the London Borough of Tower Hamlets